Kamel Marek (born February 6, 1980, in Tizi Ouzou) is an Algerian footballer. He currently plays as a midfielder for USM Alger in the Algerian League.

Club career
 2004-2005 MO Béjaïa 
 2005-2007 JS Kabylie 
 2007-pres. USM Alger

External links
 DZFoot Profile

1980 births
Living people
Footballers from Tizi Ouzou
Kabyle people
Algerian footballers
JS Kabylie players
USM Alger players
MO Béjaïa players
Competitors at the 2001 Mediterranean Games
Association football midfielders
Mediterranean Games competitors for Algeria
21st-century Algerian people